Stefano Valdegamberi (born 6 May 1970 in Tregnago) is an Italian politician from Veneto.

Political career 
A member of Christian Democracy (DC) since the late 1980s, Valdegamberi joined the Christian Democratic Centre (CCD) in 1994, after DC's disbanding. He was twice elected mayor of Badia Calavena. He was first elected to the Regional Council of Veneto in 2005 for the Union of Christian and Centre Democrats (UDC) and was regional minister of Local and Social Affairs in Galan III Government (2005–2010). Re-elected in 2010, he was appointed floor leader of the re-branded Union of the Centre (UdC).

On 2 April 2013 Valdegamberi introduced a bill in order to call a referendum on Veneto's independence by the end of the year. A month later, he left the UDC over disagreements with the party's leadership and formed a Christian-democratic regional party, Popular Future (Futuro Popolare), along with other two regional councillors (Raffaele Grazia and Gustavo Franchetto).

On 12 June 2014 the Regional Council passed Valdegamberi's bill, but the referendum was later ruled out by the Constitutional Court as contrary to the Constitution.

In the 2015 regional election Valdegamberi stood as a candidate in Luca Zaia's personal list and was re-elected handily in the provincial constituency of Verona. In the 2020 regional election Valdegamberi, then a full-fledged member of Zaia's Liga Veneta party, was re-elected from Zaia's personal list from the province of Verona.

References

1970 births
Living people
People from the Province of Verona
Christian Democracy (Italy) politicians
Christian Democratic Centre politicians
Union of the Centre (2002) politicians
Venetist politicians
Members of the Regional Council of Veneto